The Alda was a French automobile created by Fernand Charron of Charron, Girardot et Voigt (CGV). It was manufactured between 1912 and 1922. The car had a dashboard radiator and a  inline-four engine that was claimed to be capable of going "6 to 47 mph in top gear" (9.7–76 km/h). Cars were available with the Henriod rotary valve system; another version featuring six cylinders was also offered.

Name
The name ALDA was invented by the readers of the magazine l'Auto, an acronym for "Ah - La Délicieuse Automobile!". 

Vintage vehicles
Defunct motor vehicle manufacturers of France
Vehicles introduced in 1912